The 2020 Copa Libertadores qualifying stages were played from 21 January to 27 February 2020. A total of 19 teams competed in the qualifying stages to decide four of the 32 places in the group stage of the 2020 Copa Libertadores.

Draw

The draw for the qualifying stages and group stage was held on 17 December 2019, 20:30 PYST (UTC−3), at the CONMEBOL Convention Centre in Luque, Paraguay.

Teams were seeded by their CONMEBOL ranking of the Copa Libertadores as of 15 December 2019 (shown in parentheses), taking into account the following three factors:
Performance in the last 10 years, taking into account Copa Libertadores results in the period 2010–2019
Historical coefficient, taking into account Copa Libertadores results in the period 1960–2009
Local tournament champion, with bonus points awarded to domestic league champions of the last 10 years

For the first stage, the six teams were drawn into three ties (E1–E3), with the teams from Pot 1 hosting the second leg.

Notes

For the second stage, the 16 teams were drawn into eight ties (C1–C8), with the teams from Pot 1 hosting the second leg. Teams from the same association could not be drawn into the same tie, excluding the three winners of the first stage, which were allocated to Pot 2 and whose identity was not known at the time of the draw, and could be drawn into the same tie with another team from the same association.

Notes

For the third stage, the eight winners of the second stage were allocated without any draw into the following four ties (G1–G4), with the team in each tie with the higher CONMEBOL ranking hosting the second leg. As their identity was not known at the time of the draw, they could be drawn into the same tie with another team from the same association.

Second stage winner C1 vs. Second stage winner C8
Second stage winner C2 vs. Second stage winner C7
Second stage winner C3 vs. Second stage winner C6
Second stage winner C4 vs. Second stage winner C5

Format

In the qualifying stages, each tie was played on a home-and-away two-legged basis. If tied on aggregate, the away goals rule was used. If still tied, extra time was not played, and a penalty shoot-out was used to determine the winner (Regulations Article 2.4.3).

Bracket

The qualifying stages were structured as follows:
First stage (6 teams): The three winners of the first stage advanced to the second stage to join the 13 teams which were given byes to the second stage.
Second stage (16 teams): The eight winners of the second stage advanced to the third stage.
Third stage (8 teams): The four winners of the third stage advanced to the group stage to join the 28 direct entrants. The two best teams eliminated in the third stage entered the Copa Sudamericana second stage.
The bracket was decided based on the first stage draw and second stage draw, which was held on 17 December 2019.

G1

G2

G3

G4

First stage
The first legs were played on 21–22 January, and the second legs were played on 28–29 January 2020.

|}

Match E1

Guaraní won 5–0 on aggregate and advanced to the second stage (Match C7).

Match E2

Universitario won 2–1 on aggregate and advanced to the second stage (Match C1).

Match E3

Barcelona won 5–1 on aggregate and advanced to the second stage (Match C8).

Second stage
The first legs were played on 4–6 February, and the second legs were played on 11–13 February 2020.

|}

Match C1

Cerro Porteño won 2–1 on aggregate and advanced to the third stage (Match G1).

Match C2

Palestino won 6–2 on aggregate and advanced to the third stage (Match G2).

Match C3

Independiente Medellín won 4–2 on aggregate and advanced to the third stage (Match G3).

Match C4

Deportes Tolima won 2–0 on aggregate and advanced to the third stage (Match G4).

Match C5

Internacional won 2–0 on aggregate and advanced to the third stage (Match G4).

Match C6

Tied 2–2 on aggregate, Atlético Tucumán won on penalties and advanced to the third stage (Match G3).

Match C7

Tied 2–2 on aggregate, Guaraní won on away goals and advanced to the third stage (Match G2).

Match C8

Barcelona won 5–2 on aggregate and advanced to the third stage (Match G1).

Third stage
The first legs were played on 18–20 February, and the second legs were played on 25–27 February 2020.

|}

Match G1

Barcelona won 5–0 on aggregate and advanced to the group stage (Group A).

Match G2

Guaraní won 3–1 on aggregate and advanced to the group stage (Group B).

Match G3

Tied 1–1 on aggregate, Independiente Medellín won on penalties and advanced to the group stage (Group H).

Match G4

Internacional won 1–0 on aggregate and advanced to the group stage (Group E).

Copa Sudamericana qualification

The two best teams eliminated in the third stage entered the Copa Sudamericana second stage. Only matches in the third stage were considered for the ranking of teams.

Notes

References

External links
CONMEBOL Libertadores 2020, CONMEBOL.com

1
January 2020 sports events in South America
February 2020 sports events in South America